Zarela Villanueva Monge is a Costa Rican magistrate, who served as President of the Supreme Court of Justice of Costa Rica from 13 May 2013 to 13 May 2017.

Born in Cartago on 24 May 1952, she is the daughter of the liberacionista politician and three times deputy Jorge Luis Villanueva Badilla. She graduated in law at the University of Costa Rica and was president of the Student Law Association between 1975 and 1976. She is a specialist in Agricultural Law and has a postgraduate degree in Social and Family Violence from the Universidad Estatal a Distancia (UNED).

She was mayor of Turrialba canton in 1976, district attorney in Heredia Province, investigative judge and district attorney in Paraíso canton in Cartago Province until 1979, judge of first instance in civil and labor cases in Cartago until 1987 and then higher court judge in penal and labor matters. In 1989 she was appointed magistrate of the Second Chamber of the Supreme Court and was in charge of reviewing procedures in labor and family cases. Then in 2010 she was appointed Vice-President of the Supreme Court and became acting president on the death of the then President of the Supreme Court Luis Paulino Mora Mora, up to her appointment as President of the Supreme Court in her own right by the full Court in May 2013, making her the first female President of the Supreme Court of the Judiciary in Costa Rican history. She retired on 13 May 2017.

Her brother Luis Gerardo Villanueva Monge, a member of the National Liberation Party, has been a deputy in the Legislative Assembly of Costa Rica, and served as president of that body in 2010–11.

Villanueva was inducted into La Galería de las Mujeres de Costa Rica (The Costa Rican Gallery of Women) in 2007.

References 

Living people
Costa Rican women judges
20th-century Costa Rican judges
21st-century Costa Rican judges
Supreme Court of Justice of Costa Rica judges
Women chief justices
1952 births
20th-century women judges
21st-century women judges